The following is a list of bands originating from Leeds, West Yorkshire, England

 Abrasive Wheels
 Age of Chance
 Alt-J
 And None of Them Knew They were Robots
 Bearfoot Beware
 Black Star Liner
 Black Moth
 Black Wire
 Brawlers (band)
 The Bridewell Taxis
 Buen Chico
 Castrovalva (band)
 The Chevin
 Chumbawamba
 The Cribs
 Christie
 Classically Handsome Brutes
 Cryptic Shift
 Cud
 Dead Disco
 The Declining Winter
 Delta 5
 Dinosaur Pile-Up
 Distortion Mirrors
 Duels
 The Dunwells
 Eagulls
 Edsel Auctioneer
 Eureka Machines
 The Expelled
 Fig.4.0
 The Flex
 The Flying Hendersons
 ¡Forward, Russia!
 Gang of Four
 Gentleman's Dub Club
 Girls at Our Best!
 Grammatics
 Hadouken!
 Higher Power
 The Hollow Men
 Hood
 Hope & Social
 I Concur
 Icon A.D.
 I Like Trains
 Jan Dukes de Grey
 Kaiser Chiefs
 The Manhattan Love Suicides
 The March Violets
 The Mekons
 The Mission
 The Music
 The New Mastersounds
 Nightmares on Wax
 The Outer Limits
 Pale Saints
 The Parachute Men
 The Pigeon Detectives
 Pulled Apart by Horses
 Red Lorry Yellow Lorry
 The Rhythm Sisters
 The Rose of Avalanche
 Scritti Politti
 Send More Paramedics
 The Sisters of Mercy
 Sky Larkin
 Soft Cell
 Stateless
 Static Dress
 Submotion Orchestra
 The Sunshine Underground
 This Et Al
 The Three Johns
 Utah Saints
 Vessels
 Vib Gyor
 The Wedding Present
 Wild Beasts
 Yard Act
 Your Vegas

See also 
 Music in Leeds
 Bands and musicians from Yorkshire and North East England

References

 
Bands
Lists of British musicians by location